Lars Erik Stefan Holmén (born 5 December 1967) is a Swedish curler.

He participated in the demonstration curling event at the 1992 Winter Olympics, where the Swedish team finished in fifth place.

Teams

References

External links

Living people
1967 births
Swedish male curlers
Curlers at the 1992 Winter Olympics
Olympic curlers of Sweden
20th-century Swedish people